Ernst Wilhelm Eduard Ausfeld (1885–1946) was a German military officer involved in the Finnish Civil War. He was a participant in the Jäger Movement, which trained Finnish volunteers in the German Empire. He participated at the Battle of Tampere and the Battle of Vyborg alongside the White Army. Ausfeld was later awarded the Order of the Cross of Liberty by the Finnish government after the war.

References

Bibliography
 

1885 births
1946 deaths
Military personnel from Wiesbaden
People from Hesse-Nassau
20th-century German military personnel
People of the Finnish Civil War (White side)
German expatriates in Finland